Kim Yong-hak (born 20 May 2003) is a South Korean professional footballer who plays as a winger for Portimonense.

Professional career
Kim is a youth product of his local club Gwangmyeong FC, before moving to Pohang Steelers' youth academy in 2016. On 22 January 2022, he joined the Portuguese club Portimonense on loan. He made his senior debut with Portimonense as a late substitute in a 2–0 Taça da Liga loss to C.D. Nacional on 19 November 2022.

International career
Kim is a youth international for South Korea, having played up to the South Korea U20s.

References

External links
 

2003 births
Living people
People from Gwangmyeong
South Korean footballers
South Korea youth international footballers
Association football wingers
Pohang Steelers players
Portimonense S.C. players
South Korean expatriate footballers
Expatriate footballers in Portugal
South Korean expatriate sportspeople in Portugal